Morocco–Syria relations refers to bilateral and political ties between Morocco and Syria. Both are members of the United Nations, Arab League, and Organisation of Islamic Cooperation.

History
Both countries share a common history: they were formerly colonized by the Roman Empire, and later Arab conquests that saw both Morocco and Syria became Arab Muslim countries. However, Morocco became an independent kingdom while Syria became part of the Ottoman Empire until both were again together occupied by France.

Modern relations
Morocco and Syria began to establish relations upon the withdrawal of France from Morocco at 1956. However, Syria was later met with political turmoil, as the wave of pan-Arabism and anti-Israeli sentiment was on the rise. This fervour soon reached Morocco, but unlike Syria, Morocco was able to stand its ground. This was the initial cause of the tensions between the countries.

Moroccan-Syrian tensions soon erupted, with Morocco siding with the West and Syria, whilst the United Arab Republic, sided with Algeria during the Sand War. Since then, Syria had a distrust for Morocco due to its close ties with the West, particularly, the United States and Israel and they often had limited cooperation. In 1965, Moroccan King Hassan II allegedly invited Mossad and Shin Bet agents to record the Arab League's meeting in Casablanca, which was instrumental in leading to the Six-Day War and Syrian defeat. The relations improved slightly when Morocco sent troops to help its Arab allies, including Syria, during the 1973 Yom Kippur War, this slight improvement, however, did not last long.

However, Syria supported the Polisario against the Moroccans during Western Sahara War from 1975, angering Morocco, and was later admitted by Bashar al-Assad over Syria's efforts to help Polisario militants fighting Royal Moroccan Armed Forces in 2013. This was even further gone by Hafez al-Assad's decision to cut ties with Morocco after Hassan II held a secret meeting with Israeli Prime Minister Shimon Peres.

Morocco would remain in tensions with Syria throughout the rest of both leaders' reigns, and their relations only got little improvement since the death of both Hafez al-Assad and Hassan II.

Syrian Civil War

The outbreak of civil war in Syria once again strained relations, with Morocco supporting the Syrian opposition against Syrian government in Syria and has hosted meeting anti-Assad coalition in 2012 and 2013. Even though Morocco has tried to distance from the conflict and even endorsed a political solution instead of military intervention, Morocco has been accused by Syria for financing and helping the Free Syrian Army against Syrian government. Morocco expelled Syrian ambassador in 2012 as a protest against government.

While Morocco maintains supportive of Syrian refugees, cases like Syrians trapped between Algerian–Moroccan border also gave concerns to Moroccan authorities.

In 2019, due to the changing tide in favor to Damascus, Morocco opted to secure a position that would accept Syria's return to Arab League; but tensions between both countries developed by historical mistrusts still play a role on hampering its development.

References

 
Syria
Morocco